Luce de Gast (or Luces de Gast) born c. 1190, was lord of the castle of Gast, near Salisbury. He is the reputed author of the first part of the French poem Tristan. Hunt in the Oxford Dictionary of National Biography casts doubt on all aspects of the identification.

It has been suggested that 'Gast' is Gastard in Wiltshire.

References

Notes

1190 births
Year of death unknown
English male poets